Coach Carter is a 2005 American biographical teen sports drama film starring Samuel L. Jackson and directed by Thomas Carter (no relation). The film is based on the true story of Richmond High School basketball coach Ken Carter (played by Jackson), who made headlines in 1999 for suspending his undefeated high school basketball team due to poor academic results. The story was conceived from a screenplay co-written by John Gatins and Mark Schwahn. The ensemble cast features Rob Brown, Channing Tatum, Debbi Morgan, Robert Ri'chard and singer Ashanti.

The film was a co-production between the motion picture studios of MTV Films and Tollin/Robbins Productions. Theatrically and for the home video rental market, it was commercially distributed by Paramount Pictures. The film explores professional ethics, academics and athletics. The sports action in the film was coordinated by Mark Ellis. On January 11, the film's soundtrack was released by Capitol Records. The film's score was composed and orchestrated by musician Trevor Rabin.

Coach Carter was released in the United States on January 14, 2005. The film received good reviews with a score of 64% Fresh on Rotten Tomatoes and opened number one at the box office with a Martin Luther King Jr. Holiday Weekend total of over 29 million dollars. The film went on to gross $76 million worldwide.

Plot
Ken Carter lives in Richmond, California. He becomes the coach for Richmond High School’s basketball team, the Richmond Oilers, having played for the team thirty years earlier. Initially, the team is rowdy, rude, and disrespectful. Carter gives the team contracts to sign and obey, requiring them to sit in the front rows of all their classes, and maintain a 2.3 (C+) grade point average. Carter asks the school's staff for progress reports of the players' grades and attendance. Despite anger from the players' parents, most players sign the contracts, though several team members walk out in disagreement, including Timo Cruz, a gifted player who also deals drugs for his cousin Renny. The school's principal, Principal Garrison, questions Carter's contracts, suggesting that the players will be unable to meet his conditions and that he would be better off sticking to coaching basketball.

Carter begins a strict, disciplinary training regime for the team, focused largely on conditioning and teamwork. Carter's son Damian joins the team, switching from the private school St. Francis, to play for his father. Cruz witnesses the team win a game, afterwards asking Carter to let him rejoin the team. Carter agrees, but only if Cruz completes a number of exercises impossible to achieve before that Friday. Cruz commits himself to this against the odds. When he comes up short on that Friday in spite of his best efforts, the rest of the team pitches in and does the missing number of exercises for him. He is able to rejoin.

Kenyon Stone, the team's captain, struggles to come to terms with his girlfriend Kyra being pregnant. The couple have a falling out over Kenyon's inability to commit to fatherhood. Another player, Junior Battle, skips classes, leading Carter to suspend him from the team. Battle's mother Willa visits Carter, asking him to let Battle back on the team and explaining that things have been hard after her older son Antoine was killed. Carter agrees after Battle apologises.

The team continues to train and improve, bonding with Carter and becoming undefeated in the regular season. After winning the Bay Hill holiday tournament, the entire team sneaks out of the motel and attend a party at a nearby mansion while Carter is speaking to his wife on the phone. Carter discovers their absence, crashing the party to round up the team. Carter berates the boys on the way home, though Cruz points out the team are now winners as Carter intended. Later, Carter discovers that some players have not been keeping to their contracts, skipping classes and receiving poor grades.

A livid Carter locks the gym, directing the team to the library where they will study with their teachers until everyone's grades meet their contracts' terms. A disillusioned Cruz quits the team again. Carter enforces his lockdown, garnering media attention after he forfeits several games, and enraging the local community. Carter reasons that the boys have no other options in Richmond aside from crime or sports, and he is hoping their commitment to their studies will give them better options in life.

After a drug deal goes bad, Cruz watches Renny get gunned down in front of him. Distraught, Cruz goes to Carter, begging to be let back on the team. The school board holds a hearing, where Carter explains that sending his players to college and a better life is more important than basketball, and promises to resign if the lockdown is lifted. Though Principal Garrison and the board's chairwoman vote in his favor, every other councillor votes to end the lockdown. Carter prepares to leave, but discovers the team is refusing to play, choosing to continue with their studying and hold to their goal. Cruz, whom Carter had repeatedly asked "what is your deepest fear," answers by quoting from A Return to Love.

Carter decides to stay, and the team soon succeeds in their academic goal. Kenyon reunites with Kyra, learning she had an abortion. She said to him that she had a choice to make and she made it, for herself. They make up, and Kenyon asks Kyra to come with him to college, to which she agrees. The team play in the State Quarterfinals match against St. Francis, but lose by two points. Though they did not win, Carter expresses his pride that the team came together to persevere, give themselves options, and achieve the "ever elusive victory within." The film ends with the team celebrating with the community, and captions telling the fate of several key players who receive scholarships and go on to college.

Cast

 Samuel L. Jackson as Coach Ken Carter
 Rob Brown as Kenyon Stone
 Robert Ri'chard as Damien Carter
 Rick Gonzalez as Timo Cruz
 Nana Gbewonyo as Junior Battle
 Antwon Tanner as Jaron "Worm" Willis
 Channing Tatum as Jason Lyle 
 Ashanti as Kyra	
 Texas Battle as Maddux
 Denise Dowse as Principal Garrison
 Adrienne Bailon as Dominique
 Dana Davis as Peyton
 Octavia Spencer as Mrs. Willa Battle
 Sonya Eddy as Worm's mother
 Debbi Morgan as Ken Carter's wife

Production
 Production started in mid-2004 and ended in late 2004.
Filming locations for the motion picture included, Long Beach, California and Los Angeles. Such locations in Long Beach included St. Anthony High School’s gymnasium.

Soundtrack

The soundtrack for the film was released by Capitol Records on January 11, 2005. The score for the film was orchestrated by Trevor Rabin. An extensive list of songs are featured on the soundtrack, which differs from the soundtrack recording. The recording includes five songs which were not featured in the film: "About da Game" by Trey Songz; "Balla" by Mack 10 featuring Da Hood; "Beauty Queen" by CzarNok; "What Love Can Do" by Letoya; and "Wouldn't You Like to Ride", by Kanye West, Malik Yusef, and Common.

Release
Following its cinematic release in theaters, the Region 1 edition of the film was released on DVD in the United States on June 21, 2005. Special features for the DVD include; two commentaries: Coach Carter: The Man Behind the Movie, Fast Break at Richmond High, Deleted Scenes and Music Video "Hope" by Twista Featuring Faith Evans. The film was also released on VHS.

A restored widescreen high-definition Blu-ray Disc version of the film was released on December 16, 2008. Special features include two commentaries - The Man Behind the Movie; Fast Break at Richmond High; 6 Deleted scenes; "Hope" music video by Twista featuring Faith Evans; Writing Coach Carter: The Two Man Game; Coach Carter: Making the Cut; and the theatrical trailer in HD. An additional viewing option for the film in the media format of Video on demand has been made available as well.

Reception

Critical response
On Rotten Tomatoes, the film has an approval rating of 64% based on 150 reviews, with an average rating of 6.1/10. The site's critical consensus reads, "Even though it's based on a true story, Coach Carter is pretty formulaic stuff, but it's effective and energetic, thanks to a strong central performance from Samuel L. Jackson." On Metacritic, which assigns a weighted average, the film has a score of 57 out of 100, based on 36 critics, indicating "mixed or average reviews". Audiences polled by CinemaScore gave the film an average grade of "A" on a scale of A+ to F.

Box office
Coach Carter was released in theaters on January 14, 2005 in the United States. During that weekend, the film opened in 1st place grossing $24.2 million from 2,524 locations, beating out Meet the Fockers ($19.3 million). The film's revenue dropped by 24% in its third week of release, earning $8 million. For that particular weekend, the film slipped to 5th place with a slightly higher theater count at 2,574.

Coach Carter went on to top out domestically at $67.3 million through a 16-week theatrical run. For 2005 as a whole, the film would cumulatively rank at a box office performance position of 36.

Accolades
The film was nominated and won several awards in 2005–06.

See also

 List of hood films
 2005 in film
 Ken Carter
 Richmond High School

References
Footnotes

Further reading

External links

 
 Coach Carter's official website 
 
 
 

2005 biographical drama films
2000s coming-of-age drama films
2000s high school films
2000s sports drama films
2000s teen drama films
2005 films
African-American biographical dramas
African-American films
American basketball films
American coming-of-age drama films
American high school films
American sports drama films
American teen drama films
Biographical films about sportspeople
Biographical films about educators
Coming-of-age films based on actual events
Cultural depictions of American men
Cultural depictions of basketball players
Films about educators
Films about race and ethnicity
Films about teacher–student relationships
Films scored by Trevor Rabin
Films set in the San Francisco Bay Area
Films shot in Los Angeles
Films shot in San Francisco
Films with screenplays by John Gatins
Hood films
MTV Films films
Paramount Pictures films
Teen sports films
2005 drama films
Films directed by Thomas Carter (director)
2000s English-language films
2000s American films
English-language sports drama films